Long Pocket is a rural locality in the Shire of Hinchinbrook, Queensland, Australia.

History 
Long Pocket State School opened on 26 July 1915 and closed on 14 February 1994. It was at 2062 Abergowrie Road, now in neighbouring Lannercost.

Education 
There are no schools in Long Pocket. The nearest primary school is Trebonne State School in neighbouring Trebonne to the south-east. The nearest secondary school is Ingham State High School in Ingham to the south-east.

Community groups 
The Abergowrie-Long Pocket branch of the Queensland Country Women's Association meets at 2346 Abergowrie Road.

References 

Shire of Hinchinbrook
Localities in Queensland